Sainte-Anne-sur-Vilaine (literally Sainte-Anne on Vilaine) is a commune in the Ille-et-Vilaine department in Brittany in northwestern France.

Geography
The river Chère forms all of the commune's southern border, then flows into the Vilaine, which forms all of its western border.

Population
Inhabitants of Sainte-Anne-sur-Vilaine are called saintanais in French.

See also
Communes of the Ille-et-Vilaine department

References

External links

Mayors of Ille-et-Vilaine Association 

Communes of Ille-et-Vilaine